Heglig, or Panthou (also spelled Pandthow or Heglieg), is a small town at the border between the South Kordofan state of Sudan and the Unity State in South Sudan. The entirety of Heglig is claimed by both Sudan and South Sudan, but administered by Sudan. The area was contested during the Sudanese Civil War. In mid-April 2012, the South Sudanese army captured the Heglig oil field from Sudan. Sudan took it back ten days later.

Etymology
Heglig is the Arabic name of the "desert date", the fruit of the Balanites aegyptiaca tree, which is found in most parts of Africa and the Middle East. Sudanese Sufis use heglig (lalob) seeds to make rosaries. Lalob is also a favorite food for camels, goats, sheep and cattle. South Sudan does not recognize the name Heglig for the town. During the 10-day occupation by the SPLA, South Sudan restored the name of the town Panthou, a Dinka translation of the word heglig. Panthou is a combination of two words in Dinka; Pand which mean the area or home and Thou for the tree (desert dates), in which Panthou is mean land or home of desert's date. There are many places around the Dinka areas that have the name of Panthou. It was translated to Arabic word of heglig when the oil was discovered on it.

Heglig oil field
Heglig is situated within the Muglad Basin, a rift basin which contains much of South Sudan's proven oil reserves. The Heglig oil field was first developed in 1996 by Arakis Energy (now part of Talisman Energy). Today it is operated by the Greater Nile Petroleum Operating Company. Production at Heglig is reported to have peaked in 2006 and is now in decline. The Heglig oil field is connected to Khartoum and Port Sudan via the Greater Nile Oil Pipeline.

In July 2009, the international organization, Permanent Court of Arbitration (PCA) redefined the boundaries of Abyei, a county that lies between South Sudan and Sudan. The decision placed the Heglig and Bamboo oilfields out of Abyei boundary but did not specify to be belong to the Sudan province of South Kordofan, nor to Upper Nile region, South Sudan and also the decision did not specify oil sharing. The government of Sudan claimed that area is belong to its country since it was ruled to be out of Abyei boundary by PCA and announced they would not share any oil revenue with the Government of South Sudan, emphasizing that the PCA established that Heglig was part of the north. The document of the PCA only indicated that the Heglig or Panthou area is not part of Abyei.

There was fighting in the area during the 2012 Heglig Crisis, both the First Battle of Heglig and Second Battle of Heglig.

Heglig Airport
Heglig Airport hosts three Sudanese Air Force helicopter squadrons (Mil Mi-8/Mil Mi-17). The airport's runways are both gravel.

See also
 Economy of South Sudan
 Greater Nile Oil Pipeline
 Muglad Basin
Biem, South Sudan

References

Populated places in Unity (state)
Territorial disputes of South Sudan